Henrik Hagberg (born 8 September 1975) is a Swedish former bandy player who most recently for Sandvikens AIK as a midfielder.

Career

Club career
Hagberg was brought up by IFK Motala but left for Sandvikens AIK in 1998 and played there for 11 seasons.

He was a member of the Sandvikens AIK squads that won the Swedish champions in 1999–2000, 2001–02 and 2002–03 seasons. He was also a member of the Bandy World Cup winning squad in 2001–02 season.

International career
Hagberg was part of Swedish World Champions teams of 2003 and 2005

Honours

Country 
 Sweden
 Bandy World Championship: 2003, 2005

References

External links
 

1975 births
Living people
Swedish bandy players
IFK Motala players
Sandvikens AIK players
Sweden international bandy players
Bandy World Championship-winning players